Ezekiel 42 is the forty-second chapter of the Book of Ezekiel in the Hebrew Bible or the Old Testament of the Christian Bible. This book contains the prophecies attributed to the prophet/priest Ezekiel, and is one of the Books of the Prophets. The Jerusalem Bible refers to the final section of Ezekiel, chapters 40-48, as "the Torah of Ezekiel". These chapters provide the ideal picture of a new temple: chapter 42 contains Ezekiel's vision of the outbuildings  or chambers for the priests (Ezekiel 42:1-12), the use of the chambers (verses 13–14), and the dimensions of the outer court (verses 15–20).

Text
The original text was written in the Hebrew language. This chapter is divided into 20 verses.

Textual witnesses

Some early manuscripts containing the text of this chapter in Hebrew are of the Masoretic Text tradition, which includes the Codex Cairensis (895), the Petersburg Codex of the Prophets (916), Aleppo Codex (10th century), Codex Leningradensis (1008).

There is also a translation into Koine Greek known as the Septuagint, made in the last few centuries BC. Extant ancient manuscripts of the Septuagint version include Codex Vaticanus (B; B; 4th century), Codex Alexandrinus (A; A; 5th century) and Codex Marchalianus (Q; Q; 6th century).

The priests' rooms (42:1–14)
This part record the details of the rooms of chambers facing the free space reserved for the priests (denoted by letter H in the temple plan on the right) and the building on the west side of the temple (mentioned in ); the text is difficult to interpret. The exposition starts from the north rooms, apparently in 3 parallel blocks, each set in incremental height on the slope between the outer court and temple yard, with the rooms nearest to the temple twice in size of those closer to the outer court (verse 8), with the priests' kitchen at the western end (f; denoted by letter G in the temple plan).

Verse 1
  Then he brought me out into the outer court, by the way toward the north; and he brought me into the chamber which was opposite the separating courtyard, and which was opposite the building toward the north.
 The vision was given on the 25th anniversary of Ezekiel's exile, "April 28, 573 BCE"; 14 years after the fall of Jerusalem and 12 years after the last messages of hope in chapter 39. Plans for "the chambers all around" had also been included in the designs for the first temple which King David had provided for his son Solomon.

Verse 2
 Facing the length, which was one hundred cubits (the width was fifty cubits), was the north door.

Verse 13
 Then he said to me, "The north chambers and the south chambers, which are opposite the separating courtyard, are the holy chambers where the priests who approach the Lord shall eat the most holy offerings. There they shall lay the most holy offerings—the grain offering, the sin offering, and the trespass offering—for the place is holy."
Cross reference: ; ; ; ; 
 The vestibules of the inner gates are sanctified for the preparation of the offerings: "burnt, sin and guilt offerings".
The rooms have three main purposes: where the priests eat, where the priests store offerings in excess of the immediate requirements, and where the priests robe themselves for service of the altar.

The overall dimensions (42:15–20)

See also

New Jerusalem Dead Sea Scroll
Solomon's Temple
Third Temple
Related Bible parts: Leviticus 1, Leviticus 2, Leviticus 3, Leviticus 4, Leviticus 5, Leviticus 6, Leviticus 7, 1 Kings 6, 2 Chronicles 3, Isaiah 2, Ezekiel 40, Ezekiel 44, Revelation 21

Notes

References

Sources

External links

Jewish
Ezekiel 42 Hebrew with Parallel English
Ezekiel 42 Hebrew with Rashi's Commentary

Christian
Ezekiel 42 English Translation with Parallel Latin Vulgate

42